Jaffar Ali Shah (born 1930) is a Pakistani former swimmer. He competed in two events at the 1948 Summer Olympics.

References

External links
 

1930 births
Possibly living people
Pakistani male swimmers
Olympic swimmers of Pakistan
Swimmers at the 1948 Summer Olympics
Place of birth missing (living people)